Tuoru railway station  is a station on the Chinese Qinghai–Tibet Railway.

See also

 Qinghai–Tibet Railway
 List of stations on Qinghai–Tibet railway

Railway stations in Tibet
Stations on the Qinghai–Tibet Railway